The Little Mermaid:  Original Walt Disney Records Soundtrack is the soundtrack to the 1989 Disney animated feature film, The Little Mermaid. It contains the songs from the film written by Alan Menken and Howard Ashman, as well as the film's score composed by Alan Menken. The score was orchestrated by Thomas Pasatieri. The album has achieved multi-platinum sales and won the Grammy Award for Best Recording for Children.  The album includes recordings of the music that won the Grammy for Best Instrumental Composition Written for a Motion Picture or for Television ("Under the Sea"), the Academy Awards for Best Original Score and Best Original Song ("Under the Sea") and the Golden Globe Award for Best Original Score.

The soundtrack was first released by Walt Disney Records on October 19, 1989, on both CD and cassette tape. On November 22, 1994, the album was included in a four-disc box set entitled The Music Behind the Magic: The Musical Artistry of Alan Menken, Howard Ashman & Tim Rice. The box set included work tapes and demos intertwined into the finished original soundtrack.  The soundtrack (without the demos and work tapes) was re-released with different artwork, on October 14, 1997, and it was released internationally on October 31, 2000, in a double pack with The Little Mermaid II soundtrack.  On October 3, 2006, a new two-disc special edition version of the soundtrack was released to correspond with the two-disc Platinum Edition DVD release of The Little Mermaid. The first disc remains identical to the original release, yet with remastered audio while the newly added second disc is composed of various newly recorded versions of the film's songs by different artists, such as Ashley Tisdale, Raven-Symoné, The Jonas Brothers, and Jessica Simpson.  It also included two music videos, as well as new cover art. The Legacy Collection: The Little Mermaid was released as a two-disc album on November 24, 2014, to coincide with the film's twenty-fifth anniversary.

Reception

As of February 2007, the album is certified 6× Platinum by the RIAA. In 2010, Rhapsody called it one of the all-time great Disney and/or Pixar soundtracks.

Track listing

Unreleased songs/score 
Several pieces of music from the movie remained unreleased in any format from Disney until the release of "Walt Disney The Legacy Collection: The Little Mermaid" in December 2014 according to the 25th anniversary of the film. A fan-compiled complete score (including song instrumentals) does exist and can be heard/seen on video sharing websites.

 Fathoms Below (Instrumental) [1:41]
 Main Titles (Full version as heard over end credits – the last seven seconds have not been released commercially) [1:34]
 Sebastian's Fanfare  [0:06]
 Daughters of Triton (Instrumental) [0:36]
 Daughters of Triton (Film Version) [0:36]
 Part of Your World (Film Version - The version heard in the film includes score while Ariel speaks before the song starts) [3:23]
 Part of Your World (Instrumental) [3:23]
 Part of Your World (Reprise) [Instrumental] [2:14]
 Under the Sea (Instrumental) [3:11]
 Poor Unfortunate Souls (Part 1 - Instrumental) / Ursula's Deal [2:15]
 Poor Unfortunate Souls (Part 2 - Instrumental) [1:14]
 Les Poissons (Instrumental) [1:32]
 Kiss the Girl (Instrumental) [2:40]
 Vanessa on the Beach (without vocal) [1:00]
 Poor Unfortunate Souls (Reprise) (Film Version - The version heard in the film includes different laughters by Vanessa and Ursula) [0:32]
 Poor Unfortunate Souls (Reprise) [Instrumental] [0:32]
 Interrupting the Wedding / Ursula's Defeat (with vocal) [6:45]
 Happy Ending (film version) [3:10]
 Happy Ending (sans Disney chorus) [3:10]

Score composition and orchestration 
Alan Menken's first songs-and-underscore project garnered him an Academy Award for the Best Score of 1989. This would prove to give him a very high nomination-to-win ratio of awards. Menken was originally hired for the songs only, but after writing an underscore demo for the film's executives, his assignment grew. The following are some details on the film's score overall:
The most common key signature in this score is G major (including "Main Titles", the beginning portion of "Happy Ending", "Les Poissons", "Bedtime", and most instances of Ariel's solo aria). "Tour of the Kingdom" alternates between G major and E major throughout.
In darker moments, and for Ursula's theme, the key of G minor is prominent ("Poor Unfortunate Souls (Reprise)", most of "The Storm", "Eric to the Rescue" among others).
The French horn is used to symbolize King Triton (listen to "Destruction of the Grotto"), the oboe is used to symbolize Prince Eric (the beginning of "The Storm", as well as "Happy Ending" when Ariel is looking at Eric on the shore). Usually, the brass section represents Ursula and the flute almost always portrays Ariel's vocal aria. Clarinets represent Scuttle.
Synthesizers and electric pianos are used quite often in the orchestration (namely for the songs, such as "Part of Your World"), but the grand piano is almost never used.
Scuttle's leitmotif can be heard in the beginning of "Wedding Announcement", the scene after Ariel becomes a human and was the basis for "Beyond My Wildest Dreams" in the 2007 broadway production. The Scuttle leitmotif is presented in a minor key variation during the Stalling the Wedding scenes.
Ursula's leitmotif is most obvious in the track "Flotsam and Jetsam" but it comes from the melody notes for the chorus of "Poor Unfortunate Souls". This theme is also used while Ariel is being transformed, and it is played fast and supported by a harsh brass section.

Cue List 
The following is a list of the official cue names and numbers as used in the handwritten orchestra score for recording purposes. In the Legacy Collection soundtrack version, some cues were merged into one track (i.e. 9m1, 9m2, 9m2a, 9m3, 9m4 and 9m5 are one track titled "The Truth").

Chart positions

Certifications

See also
The Music Behind the Magic
Walt Disney Records: The Legacy Collection

References

1989 soundtrack albums
1980s film soundtrack albums
Disney animation soundtracks
Disney Renaissance soundtracks
Little Mermaid Soundtrack
Albums produced by Alan Menken
Walt Disney Records soundtracks
Music based on works by Hans Christian Andersen
Alan Menken soundtracks
Albums produced by Howard Ashman
Howard Ashman soundtracks
Scores that won the Best Original Score Academy Award